Canoo is an American automotive startup based in Torrance, California, that develops and manufactures electric vehicles. Canoo's research & development team is based in the Detroit region (Auburn Hills, Livonia) while production operations are in Justin, Texas. The company also plans to produce commercial electric vehicles such as vans for fleet, vehicle rental and ride sharing services.

History 
Canoo was founded in 2017 under the name Evelozcity by Stefan Krause and Ulrich Kranz. Krause worked for Deutsche Bank as its chief financial officer while Kranz worked for BMW as a senior executive. Both men met at rival EV company Faraday Future before leaving together to form their own company in 2017, due to disagreement with Faraday Future's leadership. Krause took on the role of chief executive officer at Evelozcity, and Kranz became chief technology officer. The company received its primary funding from Chinese investor Li "David" Pak-Tam/Botan and German entrepreneur David Stern.

In April Evelozcity Canoo hired Karl-Thomas Neumann, the former head of Opel as a senior executive.

In March 2019 Evelozcity was renamed Canoo.

In July 2019, Karl-Thomas Neumann left Canoo while remaining as an investor in the company.

In December 2022, the company sued several former executives of stealing Canoo's trade secrets and poaching talent for their new business, competing EV startup Harbinger Motors.

First EVs: LV & MPDV

In September 2019, the company presented its first vehicle prototype, the electric van Canoo, which was later renamed to the Canoo Lifestyle Vehicle.

In February 2020, Hyundai Motor Group, the parent company of Hyundai Motors and Kia Motors, announced that the company would partner with Canoo on the joint development of a new electric vehicle platform. The platform would be used for compact vehicles and for fleet vehicles such as shuttles. The deal is part of Hyundai's Strategy 2025 program which will see Hyundai investing US$87 billion for five years starting in 2020.

In July 2020, co-founder Stefan Krause left the company. He had previously taken an extended leave of absence in August 2019 for family reasons. Co-founder Ulrich Kranz assumed the role of permanent CEO upon Krause's departure.

Also in July 2020, Canoo was featured on the TV program Jay Leno's Garage.

In September 2020, Canoo announced a merger with the special-purpose acquisition company Hennessy Capital Acquisition Corp. IV., intending to list Canoo on the NASDAQ valued at $2.4 billion. The expectation was to raise $300 million to help finance the production of the Canoo minivan, planned for launch in 2022. On December 22, 2020, Canoo completed its merger with Hennessy Capital Acquisition Corp IV.

A few days before its stock exchange debut, the company announced its MPDV (Multi-Purpose Delivery Vehicle) product line. The entry level van was expected to sell for $33,000 on arrival in limited quantities in 2022, ramping up to volume production in 2023.

In mid-January 2021, The Verge reported that in the first half of 2020 Canoo had been in talks with Apple for a potential role in its secretive Titan car project.

Corporate changes
On March 11, 2021, Canoo announced the Canoo Pickup Truck, an electric pickup set to release in 2023. Canoo will offer both single-motor and dual-motor all-wheel drive options for their pickup truck, with the latter being capable of producing 600 horsepower and 550-foot-pounds of torque. The company said that the truck would have 200+ miles (322 km) of range and a 1,800-pound payload capacity. After the announcement, shares of the company rose by 14%.

It was announced in March 2021 that Canoo had terminated its partnership with Hyundai Motor Group due to a change in corporate strategy. The company also announced that it would shift away from vehicle subscriptions to selling commercial vehicles.

On April 22, 2021, the company announced that co-founder and CEO Ulrich Kranz was stepping down and would be replaced by chairman Tony Aquila as CEO.

In April 2021, the U.S. Securities and Exchange Commission launched an investigation into Canoo after its merger with Hennessy Capital Acquisition Corp. IV due to a string of executive departures, sudden changes to its business model, and class-action lawsuits brought by shareholders.

On June 17, 2021, the company announced they would build a new factory in Pryor, just outside Tulsa, Oklahoma to manufacture all of their future vehicles. The plant will be used to build "pod-shaped vans it calls 'lifestyle vehicles' beginning in 2023."

The same day, Dutch media reported that the Dutch company VDL Nedcar would start producing Canoo Minivans for the European market. Later in the year, Canoo and VDL ended the manufacturing agreement.

On November 15, 2021, the company announced it would move its headquarters to Bentonville, Arkansas and establish a manufacturing plant there.  the company still lists Torrance, California as its headquarters.

In January 2022, Canoo entered into a 10-year $17.7 million lease for a building in Bentonville, Arkansas for an "advanced industrialization facility" to be used for low-volume manufacturing. In August 2022, Canoo disclosed they had contracted with a third party for their initial vehicle production. 

Following receipt of orders in October 2022, Canoo announced plans for construction of a vehicle battery production facility at the MidAmerica Industrial Park (MAIP) in Pryor, Oklahoma. This was in addition to its earlier announcement of plans for a vehicle production plant at MAIP capable of producing 300,000 vehicles per year. In late November 2022, Canoo announced an agreement to purchase of an existing 630,000 square foot plant in Oklahoma City to start vehicle production by 2023, prior to completion of its micro megafactory in Pryor.

Firm orders
On April 13, 2022, NASA selected Canoo to supply crew transportation vehicles for its Artemis program, with a total contract value of $147,855.

In May 2022, it was reported that Canoo was struggling to find funding, the company saying that it had only enough funding to operate for one more quarter. It was also revealed around the same time that Canoo was suing investor Pak Tim Li, claiming they were selling shares improperly.

In July 2022, Walmart entered into a definitive agreement to purchase 4,500 all-electric Lifestyle Delivery Vehicles (LDV) from Canoo, with an option to buy up to 10,000 in the future. Under the terms, Walmart can terminate the agreement for convenience upon 30 days notice.

In mid-October 2022, Canoo announced two major orders. Zeeba, a relatively unknown fleet leasing operation, also based in Greater Los Angeles, ordered a combination of 5,450 LDVs and Lifestyle Vehicles (LV), with a binding commitment of 3,000 by 2024. Some days later, Canoo announced its biggest sale to date, from Kingbee, a Utah-based work-ready van fleet rental company. In addition to the binding order of 9,300 LDVs, Kingbee has the option to double the order. Kingbee outfits its vans for fleet customers in construction trades (electrical, plumbing, energy), delivery, and mobile health.

List of planned Canoo vehicles
Canoo vehicles planned for production:

References

External links 
 

2017 establishments in California
American companies established in 2017
Battery electric vehicle manufacturers
Car manufacturers of the United States
Companies based in Torrance, California
Companies listed on the Nasdaq
Electric vehicle manufacturers of the United States
Special-purpose acquisition companies
Canoo